Jason Nemes (born March 27, 1978) is an American politician who has served in the Kentucky House of Representatives from the 33rd district since 2017.

References

1978 births
Living people
Republican Party members of the Kentucky House of Representatives
People from Louisville, Kentucky
American people of Hungarian descent
21st-century American politicians